The Providence Friars women's ice hockey team is a National Collegiate Athletic Association (NCAA) Division I college ice hockey program that represents the Providence College. The Friars are a member of Hockey East. They play at the 3,030-seat Schneider Arena in Providence, Rhode Island.

History
In the 1978–79 season, the Friars held the distinction of being the first team to play the new Harvard Crimson women's ice hockey team. The result was a 17–0 triumph. In 1984, the Friars won the inaugural Eastern College Athletic Conference Women's Championship.

In Jackie Barto's first season as coach in 1994–95, the Friars were 18–9–4 and won the Eastern College Athletic Conference title. The following season, the Friars reached the ECAC championship game, but they lost to New Hampshire in a game that lasted five overtimes. The 1996–97 season were one of the most successful as Providence went 20–8–2, posting the program's eighth 20-win season. In 1997–98, Barto guided the Friars to the ECAC Tournament for the 15th consecutive season.

Providence College made history on December 5, 2009, as the Friars came away with a 4–1 victory over #3 New Hampshire in Durham. Providence became the first Hockey East team to earn a victory at the Whittemore Center since the league's inception in 2002–03. On January 9, 2010, Providence College women's hockey earned their 600th victory by defeating #8 Cornell by a score of 6–3. Junior Jean O'Neill tallied a goal and an assist. Genevieve Lacasse made 22 saves to record the victory. Providence joined New Hampshire as the only two programs with 600 victories.

The Friars finished the season with a conference record 11-5-5 (overall record of 15-10-9) to finish atop the Hockey East standings for the first time. Bob Deraney won the Hockey East Coach of the Year award.

On January 10, 2011, the Friars and the Dartmouth Big Green played each other in an outdoor game at Fenway Park in Boston. Providence skater Brooke Simpson scored her first career NCAA goal. With 1:14 remaining in regulation, Big Green forward Camille Dumais scored the game-winning goal on Providence netminder Genevieve Lacasse as the Big Green prevailed by a 3-2 mark.

Season-by-season results
Note: GP = Games played, W = Wins, L = Losses, T = Ties

Players
Jackie Barto's success in athletics began as a student-athlete at Providence, where she became one of greatest to ever don the Providence uniform. Barto (formerly Gladu) accumulated 113 career goals. Currently, she remains third on the all-time Friar goal list, trailing only Cammi Granato (1989–93; 139 career goals) and Stephanie O'Sullivan (1991–95; 126 career goals). Both of these players were coached by Barto. She is ranked fifth on Providence's all-time scoring list with 200 career points and 11th in career assists with 87. During her time as a Friar, Barto was associated with three of Providence's six ECAC championships, winning one as a head coach (1995), one as an assistant (1994) and one as a player (1984).
On November 12, 2008, former Friar women's ice hockey player Stephanie O'Sullivan was one of four inductees enshrined into the Massachusetts Hockey Hall of Fame class of 2008. As a Friar, O'Sullivan was named ECAC Player of the Year and New England Hockey Writers Player of the Year in 1995. During the 1994-95 season, she scored 40 goals and 28 assists for 68 points. The only time she was not named to the ECAC All-Star Team was as a freshman. In her freshman year, she was named the ECAC Rookie of the Year. O’Sullivan is second all-time in career points (253), first in assists (127) and second in goals scored (126). O'Sullivan would go on to play for Team USA in the World Championships in 1994, 1997, 1999 and 2000.

Current roster
As of September 11, 2022.

Players with international experience
Sandra Abstreiter, Team Germany U-18
Chris Bailey
Laurie Baker, Member of the 1997 U.S. National Team
Alana Blahoski
Lisa Brown-Miller
Sara Decosta (born 1977), US Women's hockey goalie Olympic champion
Cammi Granato, Member of the 1998 and 2002 US Olympic Team
Sara Hjalmarsson, Sweden Women's National Team, 2019 IIHF Women's World Championship
Mari Pehkonen, 2006 Finland Olympic Team
Karen Thatcher, 2010 US Olympic Team

Notable players
Laurie Baker
Sara DeCosta
Cammi Granato
Genevieve Lacasse
Heather Linstad
Mari Pehkonen
Karen Thatcher
Alison Wheeler

Cammi Granato
While at Providence College, she set every school scoring record. Granato was named Rookie of the Year as a freshman and Player of the Year as a sophomore, junior and senior. Granato led the Lady Friars to back-to-back conference titles in 1991-92 and 1992–93.

She finished her career with 256 points, a record she holds to this day. She is also the leader for single-season points with 84 (1992–93), goals with 48 (1991–92), and assists with 43 (1992–93). She is the all-time leading goal scorer at Providence College with an impressive 139 career tallies, and ranks second all-time in assists with 117.

In August 2008, Granato was inducted into the U.S. Hockey Hall Of Fame.  In addition, Granato is one of only two women honored in the Hockey Hall of Fame in Toronto, Ontario, Canada.  She was inducted in November, 2010 along with Canadian Angela James.

Awards and honors

ECAC Honors
 Laurie Baker, 1996 ECAC Rookie of the year
 Laurie Baker, Forward, 1996 All-ECAC Team
 Laurie Baker, 1996-97 ECAC First Team All-Star selection
 Laurie Baker, ECAC Player of the Week (11/19)
 Alana Blahoski, 1996 Co-ECAC Player of the Year
 Alana Blahoski, Defense, 1996 All-ECAC Team
 Sara DeCosta, ECAC Honorable Mention All-Star
 Sara DeCosta, ECAC Rookie of the Week (2/18, 3/11)
 Sara DeCosta, Women's Ice Hockey Letterwinner, 2000
Bob Deraney, 2009-10 Hockey East Coach of the Year
Bob Deraney, 2010-11 Hockey East Coach of the Year
 Cammi Granato, ECAC All-Star 1990
 Cammi Granato, ECAC All-Star 1991
 Cammi Granato, ECAC All-Star 1992
 Cammi Granato, ECAC All-Star 1993
 Cammi Granato, Eastern College Athletic Conference Player of the Year in 1991
 Cammi Granato, Eastern College Athletic Conference Player of the Year in 1992
 Cammi Granato, Eastern College Athletic Conference Player of the Year in 1993
 Catherine Hanson, ECAC Honorable Mention All-Star
 Sheila Killion, Forward, 1996 ECAC All-Tournament Team
 Katie Lachapelle, ECAC Honorable Mention All-Star
 Karen McCabe, 1996 ECAC Honor Roll
 Meghan Smith, Goaltender, ECAC All-Tournament Team
 Alison Wheeler, ECAC Honorable Mention All-Star
 Alison Wheeler, 1996 ECAC Honor Roll 
 Alison Wheeler, Women's Ice Hockey Letterwinner, 1997
Rookie of the Year: Marie-Philip Poulin, Boston University

New England Hockey Writer's
 Alison Wheeler, 1994-95 New England Hockey Writer's All-Star selection
 Laurie Baker, 1996-97 New England Hockey Writer's All-Star selection
Kelli Halcisak, Defense, 2001-02 New England Hockey Writers Women's Division I All-Star Team
 Ashley Payton, Forward 2001-2002 New England Writers D-1 All Star Team

Hockey East
Sandra Abstreiter, 2020-21 Hockey East Third Team All-Star
Brooke Becker, 2020-21 Hockey East All-Rookie Team
 Jessica Cohen, Bauer Rookie of the Month, of the Month, October 2009
Lauren DeBlois, 2020-21 Hockey East Third Team All-Star
Sara Hjalmarsson, 2020-21 Hockey East Second Team All-Star
 Genevieve Lacasse, Hockey East Rookie of the Year, 2009
 Genevieve Lacasse, Bauer Goaltender of the Month, December 2009
Genevieve Lacasse, Hockey East Goaltender of the Month (October 2010) 
 Jean O’Neill, WHEA Player of the Month, January 2010
 Mari Pehkonen, HOCKEY EAST All-Tournament team, 2007
 Karen Thatcher, 2004 HOCKEY EAST Sportsmanship Award 
 Karen Thatcher, HOCKEY EAST Player of the Week Honors two times (11/8/04), and (1/31/05)
Claire Tyo, 2020-21 Hockey East All-Rookie Team
 Laura Veharanta, Hockey East All-Rookie Team, 2009
 Sonny Watrous, Hockey East All-Rookie Team, 2004
 Sonny Watrous, Hockey East Rookie of the Year, 2004
 Sonny Watrous, 2004 HOCKEY EAST All-Tournament Team
 Sonny Watrous, Named HOCKEY EAST Player of the Week (1/19/04)
 Sonny Watrous, Three time HOCKEY EAST Rookie of the Week (2/2/04, 3/15/04, 3/22/04)
 Sonny Watrous, HOCKEY EAST Rookie of the Month (3/2/04)
 Sonny Watrous, HOCKEY EAST Player of the Week Honors twice (10/25/04, 1/10/05)
 Sonny Watrous, 2005 HOCKEY EAST All-Tournament Team
 Ashley Payton, 2003 Hockey East First Team All-Star
 Rush Zimmerman, 2004-05 Hockey East ITECH Three Stars Award

All-Americans
 Sara DeCosta, 1999 American Women's College Hockey Alliance All-Americans, Second Team

Providence Hockey East All-Decade Team
December 22, 2011: In recognition of the ten-year anniversary of the Women's Hockey East Association, the Friars announced their Providence Hockey East All-Decade Team. Six forwards, five defenders and two goalies were honored.

Friars in professional hockey

See also
Providence Friars men's ice hockey
Providence Friars
 List of college women's ice hockey coaches with 250 wins (John Marchetti ranks eighth on all-time list)

References

External links
Official website

 
Ice hockey clubs established in 1974
Ice hockey teams in Rhode Island